Garrison's Gorillas is an ABC TV series originally broadcast from 1967 to 1968; a total of 26 hour-long episodes were produced. It was inspired by the 1967 film The Dirty Dozen, which featured a similar scenario of training Allied prisoners for World War II military missions.

Garrison's Gorillas was canceled at the close of its first season and replaced by The Mod Squad in 1968. It managed to gather a cult following in China in the 1980s.

Plot
This action series focused on a group of commandos recruited from stateside prisons to use their special skills against the Germans in World War II. They had been promised a parole at the end of the war if they worked out (and if they lived). The alternative was an immediate return to prison; if they ran, they could expect execution for desertion. The four were: "Actor" (Cesare' Danova), a handsome, resonant-voiced con man; "Casino" (Rudy Solari), a tough, wiry safe-cracker and mechanic;  "Goniff" (Christopher Cary), a slender, likable cat burglar; and "Chief" (Brendon Boone), a rugged, somber American Indian who handled a switchblade like he was born to it. No real names were ever used, only their "monikers" or aliases.  Led by West Pointer First Lt. Craig Garrison (Ron Harper) and headquartered in a secluded mansion in London, this slippery group ranged all over Europe in exploits that often took them behind enemy lines. Other recruits were sometimes brought in where special skills were required. In the episode "Banker's Hours", Jack Klugman's character is recruited to help loot a vault. In "The Magnificent Forger", comedian Larry Storch plays a con brought in to help 'doctor' a Gestapo list of American agents. And in the two-parter "War And Crime/Plot to Kill", a con played by Richard Kiley is recruited because he is a dead ringer for a German field marshal who was part of a plot to assassinate Hitler. The episodes are set in 1941, 1942, 1943 and 1944.

Cast
Ron Harper as Lt. Craig "Warden" Garrison
Cesare Danova as Actor
Brendon Boone as Chief
Rudy Solari as Casino
Christopher Cary as Goniff

Episodes

Reviews

TV Guide reviewer Cleveland Amory said of the show in 1968 that, despite it being ludicrously one-sided, a second-hand idea, and third degree violence, that it was a first-rate show.

Because it was one of the first U.S. television shows exported to China, Garrison's Gorillas (《加里森敢死队》 Jiālǐ sēn gǎnsǐduì, or "Garrison's Death Squad") developed a certain cult status in the 1980s; supposedly, high-level meetings of the Chinese Communist Party were rescheduled so the members could watch the program. Garrison's Gorillas was even awarded a Public Security Award in Shanghai, as many Chinese people (even criminals) stayed home to watch it.

Spin-offs and tie-ins
Dell Comics published a short-lived five issue comic book based on the series lasting from January 1968 to October 1969)

Two spin-off novels were written by Jack Pearl: the first a mass-market adult paperback published by Dell, called, simply Garrison's Gorillas; the second aimed at the young adult (YA) market and published by Whitman, titled Garrison's Gorillas and the Fear Formula. Both are long out of print.

In 1967 Leaf produced a trading card set consisting of 72 black and white photographs from the series.

References

External links

 
 
 Complete Garrison's Gorillas Episode Guide
 

American Broadcasting Company original programming
World War II television drama series
Dell Comics titles
Television series based on actual events
Television shows adapted into comics
1967 American television series debuts
1968 American television series endings
American military television series
English-language television shows
Television series by Selmur Productions